Tristaniopsis yateensis is a species of plant in the family Myrtaceae. It is endemic to New Caledonia.  It is threatened by habitat loss.

References

Endemic flora of New Caledonia
yateensis
Endangered plants
Taxonomy articles created by Polbot
Taxa named by John Dawson (botanist)